The Kalamazoo, Lake Shore and Chicago Railway (aka The Fruit Belt Line) operated on track laid between Kalamazoo and South Haven, Michigan.  Much of the track has been removed and is now known as the "Van Buren Trail".

The railway went through the following towns, starting from the east:

Kalamazoo, Michigan
Oshtemo, Michigan
Brighton, Michigan
Rix, Michigan
Walker, Michigan
Eassom, Michigan
Mattawan, Michigan
Newbre, Michigan
Lawton, Michigan
Paw Paw, Michigan
Barrison, Michigan
Lake Cora, Michigan
Lawrence, Michigan
Hartford, Michigan
Toquin, Michigan
Covert, Michigan
Packard, Michigan
Fruitland, Michigan
Cableton, Michigan
South Haven, Michigan

References

External links
Van Buren County Road Commission - Van Buren Trail page
Southwest Michigan Fruit Belt Project
Record of KLS&C #950 Pullman passenger car in private collection
Pioneer Railcorp (current owner since 1995) - info on dinner train excursions
1909 Report on KLS&C by the Michigan Railroad Commission
Michigan Passenger Stations - currently missing KLS&C depot photos...

West Michigan
Companies based in Kalamazoo, Michigan
Transportation in Van Buren County, Michigan
Transportation in Allegan County, Michigan
Defunct Michigan railroads
Railway companies established in 1906
1906 establishments in Michigan
Railway companies disestablished in 1916
1916 disestablishments in Michigan